Roberto Marcos Saporiti (born 11 April 1939 in Buenos Aires) is an Argentine retired footballer. He  played as a striker, but is currently a manager. He has managed clubs in Argentina, Mexico and Colombia.

Playing career

Saporiti started his professional career with Club Atlético Independiente in 1957. In 1960 he was part of the squad that won the Primera División Argentina championship.

In 1962 he moved down a division to play for Club Atlético Lanús and in 1963 he moved to Deportivo Español where he played alongside Carlos Bilardo.

Saporiti had a spell playing in Uruguay for Racing Club de Montevideo before returning to Argentina in 1971 to play for Club Atlético Platense.

Titles as a player

Managerial career

Saporiti has held managerial positions at a large number of clubs. Most notably he coached Argentinos Juniors to their first ever title in 1984, he has had five spells as manager of Talleres de Córdoba (1977–1979, 1988, 1995, 2006 and 2009) and he coached Loma Negra in the early 1980s, the most successful period in their history. He has also coached Argentine clubs Chacarita Juniors, Rosario Central, San Lorenzo and had a spell as caretaker manager of Boca Juniors. Between 2007 and 2008 he had a second spell as manager of Olimpo de Bahía Blanca.

Saporiti has also coached Junior in Colombia and a number of clubs in Mexico including Veracruz, Atlante, Pumas, Necaxa, Tecos UAG and Puebla.

Managerial titles

References

1939 births
Living people
Footballers from Buenos Aires
Argentine footballers
Association football forwards
Club Atlético Independiente footballers
Club Atlético Lanús footballers
Deportivo Español footballers
Racing Club de Montevideo players
Club Atlético Platense footballers
Santiago Morning footballers
Argentine Primera División players
Argentine expatriate footballers
Expatriate footballers in Chile
Expatriate footballers in Uruguay
Argentine football managers
Chacarita Juniors managers
Rosario Central managers
Talleres de Córdoba managers
Argentinos Juniors managers
Boca Juniors managers
San Lorenzo de Almagro managers
Olimpo managers
Club Universidad Nacional managers
Atlante F.C. managers
Club Necaxa managers
C.D. Veracruz managers
Club Puebla managers
Club León managers
Tecos F.C. managers
Atlético Junior managers
Defensa y Justicia managers
Estudiantes de Buenos Aires managers
Argentina national under-20 football team managers
Club Blooming managers